Iwo Jima is a turn-based strategy video game developed and published by Personal Software Services for the Commodore 64 and ZX Spectrum in 1986. It is the second instalment to the Strategic Wargames series. The game is set during the Battle of Iwo Jima in the Pacific Ocean theatre of World War II and revolves around the United States Marine Corps' objective to secure the island of Iwo Jima from the Imperial Japanese Army.

The game is a turn-based strategy and focuses on the player using their units to attack Japanese forces in order to capture the island. The player assumes control of the Marine Corps and must eliminate all Japanese forces by ground, air, or naval combat. The game received mixed reviews upon release. Critics praised the game's value for money and easy difficulty for novice gamers; however, many criticised the graphics and mechanics.

Gameplay

The game is a turn-based strategy focuses on the invasion and land battles of Iwo Jima. The player commands the United States Marine Corps against the Imperial Japanese Army, who are occupying the islands as part of the Pacific Ocean theatre of World War II. The game is menu-based and only allows the player to use four command functions; move, attack, land and pass. Depending on the difficulty set, the game lasts 32 to 36 turns and can only be won by eliminating all Japanese forces from the island before the final turn ends. During the game, the enemy may fortify their positions, launch air strikes against the United States Navy fleet or may perform suicide attacks if their unit is about to be wiped out. The player also has the ability to order air strikes against the enemy, if weather permits.

At the beginning of the game, the player has to allocate a number of American troops in order to establish a beachhead on one of the six beaches of the island. However, many of the beaches are scattered with land mines and may provide an initial disadvantage to the assault. Throughout the game, the player may call in air strikes and other assaults, however they are only available after the American forces are attacked or if the enemy retreats to an inaccessible location. At any time in the game, the player is also able to request troop reinforcements from the fleet. Furthermore, Japanese air forces may sink American battleships throughout the game, although the player will be given the opportunity to shoot them down. In addition, a Japanese submarine will sink American gunboats at random intervals, and cannot be destroyed in any way. There is no save function in the game.

Background
Personal Software Services was founded in Coventry, England, by Gary Mays and Richard Cockayne in 1981. The company were known for creating games that revolved around historic war battles and conflicts, such as Theatre Europe, Bismark and Falklands '82. The company had a partnership with French video game developer ERE Informatique, and published localised versions of their products to the United Kingdom. In 1986, Cockayne took a decision to alter their products for release on 16-bit consoles, as he found that smaller 8-bit consoles such as the ZX Spectrum lacked the processing power for larger strategy games. The decision was falsely interpreted as "pulling out" from the Spectrum market by video game journalist Phillipa Irving. Following years of successful sales throughout the mid 1980s, Personal Software Services experienced financial difficulties, in what Cockayne admitted in a retrospective interview that "he took his eye off the ball". The company was acquired by Mirrorsoft in February 1987, and was later dispossessed by the company due to strains of debt.

Reception

The game received mixed reviews from critics upon release. Both Gwyn Hughes of Your Sinclair and a reviewer of ZX Computing praised the game's value for money and heralded it as a "good introduction" to the wargaming genre, although Hughes believed that Iwo Jima was unlikely to provide established tacticians with a "major challenge" and the reviewer of ZX Computing was concerned that the game was "too easy".  Sean Masterson of Crash criticised the graphics, stating that it was "let down by poor unit markers and terrain features". Gary Rook of Sinclair User asserted that the game was overall "competent", however he summarised it as "failing to excite". Rook also added that the game was well implemented and "inspiring".

A reviewer of Computer and Video Games criticised the game for having an "awkward mechanism" due to the lack of a save feature and neglecting historic realism. However, he compared the historical accuracy of the Battle of Iwo Jima for being more accurate than Falklands '82s interpretation of the Falklands War. Mark Reed of Computer Gamer stated that the game is "ideal" for novice players and also praised the simplicity of the controls, despite suggesting that experienced gamers of the genre would prefer "something more complex". Masterson similarly criticised the game's suitability for experienced gamers, suggesting that any appeal for a more experienced player is likely to be "very limited".

M. Evan Brooks reviewed the game for Computer Gaming World, and stated that "While Iwo/Falklands may not be to the taste of the experienced wargamer, they may prove just the ticket to gaining another convert to computer conflict simulations."

References

1986 video games
Commodore 64 games
Single-player video games
Turn-based strategy video games
Video games about the United States Marine Corps
Video games developed in the United Kingdom
World War II video games
ZX Spectrum games
Personal Software Services games